Ladies Beach may refer to:

Ladies Beach, Ulcin, Montenegro
Ladies Beach, Kuşadası, Turkey